732 Tjilaki (prov. designation:  or ) is a dark background asteroid, approximately  in diameter, located in the inner region of the asteroid belt. It was discovered by German astronomer Adam Massinger at the Heidelberg Observatory on 15 April 1912, and later named after the Cilaki (Tjilaki) river in Indonesia. The dark D-type asteroid has a rotation period of 12.3 hours. It was an early candidate to be visited by the Rosetta spacecraft which eventually rendezvoused comet 67P/Churyumov–Gerasimenko.

Orbit and classification 

Tjilaki is a non-family asteroid of the main belt's background population when applying the hierarchical clustering method to its proper orbital elements. It orbits the Sun in the inner asteroid belt at a distance of 2.3–2.6 AU once every 3 years and 10 months (1,406 days; semi-major axis of 2.46 AU). Its orbit has an eccentricity of 0.04 and an inclination of 11° with respect to the ecliptic. The body's observation arc begins at Heidelberg Observatory on 28 August 1913, or 16 months after its official discovery observation.

Naming 

This minor planet was named after the Cilaki (Tjilaki) river in West Java, Indonesia. The river rises in the mountains where the city of Malabar (see asteroid 754 Malabar) is located. The  was mentioned in The Names of the Minor Planets by Paul Herget in 1955.

Rosetta mission 

In the Phase A study of the Rosetta mission, Tjilaki was considered an alternative visiting target to comet 46P/Wirtanen. However, both candidates were later abandoned in favor of comet 67P/Churyumov–Gerasimenko, which was visited by Rosetta in 2014. The retargeting was necessary as the spacecraft's launch window changed due to a delay caused by the launch failure of the  satellite on the maiden flight of the Ariane 5 ECA carrier rocket in 2002.

Physical characteristics 

In both the Tholen- and SMASS-like taxonomic variants of the Small Solar System Objects Spectroscopic Survey (S3OS2), Tjilaki is a dark D-type asteroid, uncommon in the inner but abundant in the outer asteroid belt as well as among the Jupiter trojan population. Polarimetric observations also determined a D-type.

Rotation period and poles 

In February 1996, a rotational lightcurve of Tjilaki was obtained from photometric observations over ten nights by European astronomers using the Dutch 0.9-metre Telescope and the Bochum 0.61-metre Telescope at La Silla Observatory in Chile. Lightcurve analysis gave a rotation period of  hours with a brightness variation of  magnitude. 

In May 2012, astronomers at the Palomar Transient Factory measured a period of  hours.

In 2016, a modeled lightcurve gave a concurring sidereal period of  hours using data from the Uppsala Asteroid Photometric Catalogue, the Palomar Transient Factory survey, and individual observers, as well as sparse-in-time photometry from the NOFS, the Catalina Sky Survey, and the La Palma surveys . The study also determined two spin axes of (160.0°, 23.0°) and (353.0°, 24.0°) in ecliptic coordinates (λ, β).

Diameter and albedo 

The Collaborative Asteroid Lightcurve Link derives an albedo of 0.0763 and a diameter of 37.69 kilometers based on an absolute magnitude of 10.53.

These timed observations are taken when the asteroid passes in front of a distant star.

References

External links 
 Lightcurve Database Query (LCDB), at www.minorplanet.info
 Dictionary of Minor Planet Names, Google books
 Asteroids and comets rotation curves, CdR – Geneva Observatory, Raoul Behrend
 Discovery Circumstances: Numbered Minor Planets (1)-(5000) – Minor Planet Center
 
 

000732
Discoveries by Adam Massinger
Named minor planets
19120415